Julian Zenger (born 26 August 1997) is a German professional volleyball player. He is part of the German national team, and a silver medallist at the 2017 European Championship. At the professional club level, he plays for Kioene Padova.

Honours

Clubs
 CEV Champions League
  2021/2022 – with Itas Trentino

 FIVB Club World Championship
  Betim 2021 – with Itas Trentino

 National championships
 2019/2020  German SuperCup, with Berlin Recycling Volleys
 2019/2020  German Cup, with Berlin Recycling Volleys
 2020/2021  German SuperCup, with Berlin Recycling Volleys
 2020/2021  German Championship, with Berlin Recycling Volleys
 2021/2022  Italian SuperCup, with Itas Trentino

References

External links

 
 Player profile at LegaVolley.it 
 Player profile at Volleybox.net

1997 births
Living people
People from Wangen im Allgäu
Sportspeople from Tübingen (region)
German men's volleyball players
German expatriate sportspeople in Italy
Expatriate volleyball players in Italy
Trentino Volley players
Liberos